The 1999 Finnish Cup was the 45th season of the main annual association football cup competition in Finland. It was organised as a single-elimination knock–out tournament and participation in the competition was voluntary.  The final was held at the Olympic Stadium, Helsinki on 30 October 1999 with FC Jokerit defeating FF Jaro by 2-1 before an attendance of  3,217 spectators.

Early rounds 
Not currently available.

Round 7

Quarter-finals

Semi-finals

Final

References

External links
 Suomen Cup Official site 

Finnish Cup seasons
Finnish Cup, 1999
Finnish Cup, 1999